Driessen is a Dutch and Low German patronymic surname meaning son of Dries or Andries cognate to Andreas and the English Drew/Andrew. People with the name Driessen, Driesen, Driessens, or  Drießen include:

Casey Driessen (b. 1978), American bluegrass fiddler
Dan Driessen (b. 1951), American baseball player
David Driessen (b. 1994), Dutch football forward
 (born 1958), Dutch singer-songwriters
Friedrich Wilhelm von Driesen (1781-1851), Baltic-Russian military officer
Jack Driessen (b. 1980), Dutch music composer
Jeanne Driessen (1892–1997), Flemish politician
Johan Driessen (b. 1981), Dutch politician
Lomme Driessens (1912-2006), Belgian cycling directeur sportif
Michiel Driessen (b. 1959), Dutch fencer
Paul Driessen (animator) (b. 1940), Dutch film director, animator and writer
Paul Driessen (lobbyist) (b. 1948), American author and lobbyist
Stef Driesen (b. 1966), Belgian artist
Steffen Driesen (b. 1981), German swimmer
Tim Driesen (b. 1978), Belgian actor
Wilma Driessen (b. 1938), Dutch opera singer
Yannick Driesen (born 1988), Belgian basketball player
Mati Driessen (born 1910), German honored as Righteous Gentile at Yad Vashem in Israel

See also
Andriessen
Drezdenko (German name Driesen), Polish town

Dutch-language surnames
Patronymic surnames
Surnames from given names